Calycadenia spicata is a species of flowering plant in the family Asteraceae known by the common name spiked western rosinweed. It is endemic to central California, where is a common grassland plant in the Central Valley and adjacent Sierra Nevada foothills from Butte County to Kern County.

Calycadenia spicata is an annual herb producing a hairy, glandular stem 20 to 60 centimeters (8-24 inches) tall. The leaves are linear in shape and up to 5 centimeters (2 inches) long, sometimes longest toward the middle of the stem. The inflorescence bears one or more flower heads at separate nodes, surrounded by short bracts tipped with resin glands. The glandular and hairy flower heads have a center of several disc florets as well as whitish, triple-lobed ray florets. The fruit is an achene; those arising from the disc florets have a pappus of scales.

References

External links
photo of herbarium specimen at Missouri Botanical Garden, collected in Calaveras County, isotype of Calycadenia spicata
Jepson Manual Treatment
United States Department of Agriculture Plants Profile
Calphotos Photo gallery, University of California

spicata
Flora of California
Plants described in 1882